Nataliya Zyatikova (born 5 May 1974) is a Belarusian cross-country skier. She competed in five events at the 2002 Winter Olympics.

References

External links
 

1974 births
Living people
Belarusian female cross-country skiers
Olympic cross-country skiers of Belarus
Cross-country skiers at the 2002 Winter Olympics
People from Kemerovo
Sportspeople from Kemerovo Oblast